The 2003 season was the 91st year of competitive soccer in the United States.

National team

The home team or the team that is designated as the home team is listed in the left column; the away team is in the right column.

Major League Soccer

Standings

Top eight teams with the highest points clinch play-off berth, regardless of conference.x = Playoff berthy = Conference Winner (Season)s = Supporters Shield/Conference winner (Season)

Playoffs

MLS Cup

A-League

Standings

Eastern Conference

Northeast Division

Southeast Division

Western Conference

Central Division

Pacific Division

Playoffs

Lamar Hunt U.S. Open Cup

Bracket
Home teams listed on top of bracket

Final

American clubs in international competitions

Los Angeles Galaxy

Columbus Crew

New England Revolution

San Jose Earthquakes

References
 American competitions at RSSSF
 American national team matches at RSSSF
 CONCACAF Champions' Cup at RSSSF

 
2003